
Gmina Stubno is a rural gmina (administrative district) in Przemyśl County, Subcarpathian Voivodeship, in south-eastern Poland, on the border with Ukraine.

Villages
Gmina Stubno contains the villages and settlements of Barycz, Chałupki Dusowskie, Gaje, Hruszowice, Kalników, Kolonia Stubno, Kowaliki, Nakło, Pogorzelec, Starzawa, Stubienko, Stubno and Zagroble.

Neighbouring gminas
Gmina Stubno is bordered by the gminas of Medyka, Orły, Radymno and Żurawica. It also borders Ukraine.

References

Polish official population figures 2006

Stubno
Przemyśl County